Meltzer is an unincorporated community in Liberty Township, Shelby County, in the U.S. state of Indiana.

History
A post office was established at Meltzer in 1880, and remained in operation until it was discontinued in 1905. The community has the name of a family of settlers.

Geography

References

Unincorporated communities in Shelby County, Indiana
Unincorporated communities in Indiana